Errera Channel is a channel between Rongé Island and the west coast of Graham Land. It was discovered by the Belgian Antarctic Expedition, 1897–1899, under Adrien de Gerlache, who named this feature for Leo Errera, a professor at the University of Brussels and a member of the Belgica Commission.

See also
Orel Ice Fringe

References 

Straits of Graham Land
Danco Coast